Scott Rayow, often credited as Scottie Ray, is an American voice actor who has worked for NYAV Post, DuArt Film and Video, 4Kids Entertainment and Central Park Media. He is best known for voicing The Shredder in the 2003 Teenage Mutant Ninja Turtles series.

Filmography

Anime

Animation

Video games

References

External links
 
 
 Scott Rayow at Crystal Acids
 

Living people
American male voice actors
American male video game actors
Place of birth missing (living people)
Male actors from New York City
Year of birth missing (living people)